The European Union (Finance) Act 2015 (c. 32) was an Act of the Parliament of the United Kingdom enacted to approve for the purposes of section 7(1) of the European Union Act 2011 the decision of the Council of 26 May 2014 on the system of own resources of the European Union; and to amend the definition of "the Treaties" and "the EU Treaties" in section 1(2) of the European Communities Act 1972 so as to include that decision. It received royal assent on 21 July 2015.

The act was repealed by the European Union (Withdrawal) Act 2018.

See also
Budget of the European Union
European Council
European Union Act 2011
 List of Acts of the Parliament of the United Kingdom relating to the European Communities / European Union
Multiannual Financial Framework

References

United Kingdom Acts of Parliament 2015
Acts of the Parliament of the United Kingdom relating to the European Union